William Tancred may refer to:
 William Tancred (politician), English politician
 William Tancred (priest), Anglican priest in Australia
 Bill Tancred, sports administrator, academic and athlete